Aldeia da Roupa Branca is a 1938 Portuguese film directed by Chianca de Garcia.

Plot 
The life, picturesque customs, pesky conflicts and passions of the populars who are in charge of washing the clothes of Lisbon inhabitants  – an artisanal but very competitive industry... Competition between carriers: Uncle Jacinto and the sour goddaughter Gracinda, with the widow Quitéria and her son Luis.

Cast
 Beatriz Costa: Gracinda
 José Amaro: Chico
 Manuel Santos Carvalho: Uncle Jacinto
 Óscar de Lemos: Luis
 Elvira Velez: Widow Quitéria
 Armando Machado : Zé da Iria
 Octavio de Matos: Simão
 Jorge Gentil: Chitas
 Mario Santos: Borges
 Aida Ultz
 Carlos Alves

References

External links

Portuguese black-and-white films
Portuguese comedy films
1938 comedy films
1938 films
Films shot in Portugal
1930s Portuguese-language films